170th meridian may refer to:

170th meridian east, a line of longitude east of the Greenwich Meridian
170th meridian west, a line of longitude west of the Greenwich Meridian